Exorcise the Demons is a studio album by drum and bass artists Source Direct, released in 1999. The album contains 9 tracks, three of which, "Concealed Identity", "Mind Weaver", and "Technical Warfare", are previously released singles. "Call & Response" and "Capital D" are available on the duo's previous compilation album, Controlled Developments (1997).

"Call & Response" appears in the 1998 film Blade, in which the track is being listened to, on headphones, by the villain, Deacon Frost (Stephen Dorff), whilst he searches a library's archives; the song did not appear on the film's soundtrack.

Critical reception
Robert Christgau praised the "beats developed in perceptible patterns, prudently minimalist middle registers, fun vrooms and slams as musical content", and called it "light instrumental music at its diverting best".

Fact ranked it #96 on its list of the 100 best albums of the 1990s, writing that it's "a thrilling document of smacked-out, misanthropic jungle for stalkers, serial killers and ne’er-do-wells".

Track listing
 "Call & Response" – 7:09
 "Mind Weaver" – 8:45
 "Haunted" – 6:45
 "Technical Warfare" – 8:42
 "Love & Hate" – 9:22
 "Capital D" – 7:36
 "Dubstar" – 7:21
 "Wanton Conduct" – 8:43
 "Concealed Identity" – 9:33

References

1999 albums
Source Direct albums
Astralwerks albums